is a Japanese wrestler who competed in the 48 kg weight class at the 2004 and 2008 Summer Olympics, winning the silver medal at both Games.

Her younger sister Kaori is also a wrestler who competed in the 63 kg weight class at the 2004, 2008, 2012 Summer Olympics and 2016 Summer Olympics, winning the gold medal on four occasions.

Chiharu has won the Asian championship twice and the world championships three times.

Awards
Tokyo Sports
Wrestling Special Award (2003, 2004, 2006)

References

External links
 

1981 births
Living people
Sportspeople from Aomori Prefecture
People from Hachinohe
Japanese female sport wrestlers
Olympic wrestlers of Japan
Wrestlers at the 2004 Summer Olympics
Wrestlers at the 2008 Summer Olympics
Olympic silver medalists for Japan
Olympic medalists in wrestling
Asian Games medalists in wrestling
Wrestlers at the 2006 Asian Games
Medalists at the 2008 Summer Olympics
Medalists at the 2004 Summer Olympics
Medalists at the 2006 Asian Games
Asian Games gold medalists for Japan
World Wrestling Championships medalists
21st-century Japanese women